Colerain (variously spelled "Coleraine" and "Colrane") is an extinct American town in Camden County, Georgia. The GNIS classifies it as a populated place.

History
The community had its start as a small trading post located on the St. Marys River, which is the border between East Florida and Georgia. The first governor of British East Florida, Colonel James Grant, financed the creation of a portion of King's Road, stretching from New Smyrna Beach in FL and terminating in Coleraine. 

Colerain served as the first location of the United States factory for trade with the Creek Indians in the mid-1790s, until the factory was relocated to the newly constructed Fort Wilkinson in 1797. It was also the site of the signing of the Treaty of Colerain between the Creeks and the United States government on June 29, 1796. The treaty expanded the U.S.-Creek border westward, allowed for Fort Wilkinson's construction, and mandated the removal of the factory there.

The Federal Military Road, beginning in Colerain and running south through Clark's Ferry, Florida down to Tampa, was constructed between 1824 and 1827 as part of the Federal government's plan to develop military infrastructure in the area and increase the population of white settlers.

According to one tradition, the community was named after "Coleraine", a local Indian chieftain, while another tradition states the name is a transfer from Coleraine, in Ireland.

References

Geography of Camden County, Georgia
Ghost towns in Georgia (U.S. state)